Jökull: The Icelandic Journal of Earth Sciences is an annual peer-reviewed scientific journal published jointly by the  and the Geoscience Society of Iceland. The journal covers all aspects of earth sciences in relation to Iceland, including meteorology, oceanography, petrology, and geothermal research. The editor-in-chief is Bryndís Brandsdóttir. It has been classified as "Level 1" journal in the Norwegian Scientific Index.

It was founded in 1950 by Icelandic meteorologist Jón Eyþórsson, who served as its editor until his death in 1968, publishing regular measurements of glacial margins and drift ice in Jökull. These reports have continued, creating a valuable resource for climate scientists.

Jökull has been a victim of journal hijacking.

See also
Danish Journal of Geography
Fennia
Geografiska Annaler
Geological Survey of Denmark and Greenland Bulletin
Norwegian Journal of Geography
Norwegian Journal of Geology

References

Annual journals
Earth and atmospheric sciences journals
Geography of Iceland
Geology of Iceland
Glaciers of Iceland
Publications established in 1951
Hijacked journals